Emmet may refer to:

Places

Australia
 Emmet, Queensland

Germany
 Emmet (Upland), a mountain in Hesse

United States
 Emmet, Arkansas
 Emmet, Nebraska
 Emmet, North Dakota
 Emmet, South Dakota
 Emmet, Dodge County, Wisconsin, a town
 Emmet, Marathon County, Wisconsin, a town
 Emmet County, Iowa
 Emmet County, Michigan
 Emmet Township (disambiguation)

People

Surname
 A. Maitland Emmet, entomologist and school teacher
 Christopher Temple Emmet, Irish barrister and poet
 Devereux Emmet, golf course architect
 Grenville T. Emmet, American attorney and diplomat
 Katherine Emmet (1878–1960), American actress
 Lydia Field Emmet, American artist
 Richard S. Emmet Jr. (1871–1897), New York assemblyman
 Robert Emmet, leader of the 1803 Irish rebellion
 Robert Temple Emmet, US Medal of Honor winner
 Thomas Addis Emmet, lawyer and politician
 Thomas Addis Emmet (bishop), American-born Roman Catholic bishop in Jamaica 
 William Le Roy Emmet, electrical engineer

Given name
 Emmet Birk (1914–2000), American basketball player
 Emmet Bolton (born 1985), Gaelic footballer
 Emmet D. Boyle (1879–1926), American politician
 Emmet Byrne (1896–1974), American politician
 Emmet Byrne, Irish rugby union player
 Emmet Crawford (1844–1886), American soldier
 Emmet Dalton (1898–1978), Irish soldier and film producer
 Emmet Densmore (1837–1911), American businessman and physician
 Emmet Flood, American attorney
 Emmet Fox (1886–1951), New Thought spiritual leader
 Emmet French, (1886–1947) American golfer
 Emmet Friars (born 1985), footballer
 Emmet Gowin (born 1941), American photographer
 Emmet Hayes (born 1951), American lobbyist and politician
 Emmet Heidrick (1876–1916), American baseball player
 Emmet John Hughes (1920–1982), American editor, speechwriter and author
 Emmet Kirwan, Irish actor, playwright and screenwriter
 Emmet Lanigan (1909–1989), Australian cricketer
 Emmet Lavery (1902–1986), American playwright and screenwriter
 Emmet G. Lavery Jr. (1927–2014), American producer and attorney
 Emmet Malone, Irish football correspondent
 Emmet McDermott (1911–2002), Australian dentist and politician
 Emmet McHardy (1904–1933), New Zealand missionary
 Emmet McLoughlin, amateur football player
 Emmet McNamara (born 1990), Irish jockey
 Emmet Nolan (born 1995), Irish hurler
 Emmet O'Brien (born 1981), Irish auto racing driver
 Emmet O'Neal (1853–1922), American politician and lawyer
 Emmet O'Neal (Kentucky politician) (1887–1967), American politician and ambassador
 Emmet M. Reily (1866–1954), American politician 
 Emmet Sargeant, musician
 Emmet Stagg (1944), Irish politician
 Emmet Sullivan, (1887–1970), American sculptor
 Emmet G. Sullivan (born 1947), American judge
 Emmet M. Walsh (1892–1968), American prelate
 Emmet Wan (born 1992), football midfielder

Fictional characters 
Emmet Brickowski, the protagonist of The Lego Movie and its sequel The Lego Movie 2: The Second Part
Emmet Cole, in ABC's The River
Emmet Hawksworth, a character in the sitcom Keeping Up Appearances
Emmet Lefebvre, a character in the American sitcom Top of the Heap
Emmet Otter, the protagonist of Emmet Otter's Jug-Band Christmas
Emmet Ray, the protagonist of Sweet and Lowdown

Other uses 
 Emmet, an archaic English word for ant
 Emmet (heraldry), the heraldic ant
 Emmet (Cornish), a nickname for tourists
 Emmet (software), a set of tools for HTML and CSS coders, formerly known as Zen Coding

See also
 T. Emmet Clarie (1913–1997), American judge
 M. Emmet Walsh, (born 1935) American actor
 Emmett (disambiguation)